Sleep in Safety is the first studio album by American rock band 45 Grave. It was released in 1983 on record label Enigma.

Critical reception

Contemporary critical reception of the album has been generally positive. Ned Raggett of AllMusic praised the album. Trouser Press wrote that the album "contains most of their best songs", calling it "consistently creepy". Spin, on the other hand, opined that the album "never escapes Christian Death's shadow".

Track listing

1983 vinyl release

1993 remastered CD version

Personnel
 Craig Leon – co-production
 Paul B. Cutler – co-production

References

External links
 

45 Grave albums
1983 debut albums
Albums produced by Craig Leon
Enigma Records albums
Albums recorded at Capitol Studios